Morris Park may refer to:

 Marcus Garvey Park, or Mount Morris Park as it was previously named, a park in Harlem in the New York City borough of Manhattan
 Morris Park station (IRT Dyre Avenue Line), a station on the IRT Dyre Avenue Line of the New York City Subway
 Morris Park station (Metro-North), a future station on the Metro-North Railroad in the Bronx, New York
 Morris Park Facility, a maintenance facility of the Long Island Rail Road in Queens, New York
 Morris Park Racecourse, an American thoroughbred horse racing facility from 1889 until 1904 that was once home to the Belmont Stakes
 Morris Park, Bronx, a neighborhood in the Bronx borough of New York City
 Morris Park, Minneapolis, a neighborhood in the Nokomis community in Minneapolis, Minnesota
 Morris Park, Philadelphia, a city park in Overbrook, Philadelphia
 Morris State Park, a state park in the US state of Missouri
 Mount Morris Park Historic District, a historic district in New York City around Marcus Garvey Park
 Panther Park, a ballpark in Fort Worth, Texas, originally called Morris Park, home of the Fort Worth Panthers